Powerline river crossings comprise both overhead lines and cable tunnels beneath rivers and estuaries. Overhead power lines are supported on towers (called pylons in the UK) which are usually significantly taller than overland pylons and are more widely spaced to cross the river in a single span. Tall pylons ensure that the electricity cables which they support provide an adequate safety clearance for river traffic.

Overhead crossings 
The tallest and longest overhead power line river crossings in the United Kingdom are:

The tallest electricity pylons in the UK are those of the 400 kV Thames Crossing, at West Thurrock, which are 190 m (630 ft) high. These were constructed by BICC in 1965. The cables stretch 1300 m (4,500 ft) across the River Thames and have a minimum clearance of 76 m (250 ft). There are two 400 kV circuits that connect Littlebrook substation on the south bank to West Thurrock substation on the north side.  
 
The longest powerline river crossing in the UK is the Aust Severn Powerline Crossing over the River Severn at Aust, stretching 1700 m (5,310 ft) between towers 148 m (488 ft) high. The line was commissioned in 1959 and comprises two 275 kV electricity circuits forming part of the line between Iron Acton and Whitson substations. This pylon crossing is paralleled by the Severn-Wye Cable Tunnel beneath it, at almost the same location.

List of overhead powerlines 
This is an incomplete list of overhead powerline river crossings in the UK.

Cable tunnel river crossings 
In addition to overhead powerline river crossings, there are also underground powerline river crossings.

River Thames 
Tunnels under the River Thames, from east to west are:  

 Thames Cable Tunnel, between Tilbury and Gravesend, commissioned in 1970, comprising two 400 kV circuits between Tilbury and Kingsnorth substations
 Dartford Cable Tunnel, between Littlebrook substation and West Thurrock substation, constructed 2003–04, comprising two 400 kV circuits
 Barking Cable Tunnel, between Barking and Thamesmead, comprising four 33 kV circuits
 Millennium Dome electricity cable tunnel, between West Ham substation and the Millennium Dome, comprising 11 kV circuits
Deptford River Tunnel, between Deptford and Millwall Isle of Dogs, comprising 30 11 kV circuit
New Cross to Finsbury Market Cable Tunnel, between Bermondsey and Wapping, built between 2009 and 2017, comprises three 132 kV circuits
Bankside river Tunnel, between Bankside and Blackfriars, connects Bankside substation and City Road substation, comprises 132 kV and 33 kV circuits
Bankside – Charing Cross, crosses beneath Hungerford Bridge, comprises two 20 kV circuits
 Wimbledon – Pimlico Cable Tunnel, crosses the Thames between Nine Elms and Pimlico, comprises a 132 kV circuit
Battersea Power Station Tunnels
London Power Tunnels Kensal Green to Wimbledon, crosses the Thames between Wandsworth and Hurlingham, constructed between 2011 and 2016, comprises a single 400 kV circuit.

Cable tunnels under other rivers 
Other underground tunnel cable crossings are: 

 River Medway Cable Tunnels under the lower River Medway between Grain and Chetney Marshes, Kent, built between 1973–76, comprises two 400 kV circuits
 Fawley Tunnel under Southampton Water between Fawley and Chilling, built between 1962 and 1965, comprises two 400 kV circuits
Severn-Wye Cable Tunnel under the River Severn and Wye between Aust and Newhouse, two 400 kV circuits. This runs parallel to the Severn overhead pylon crossing (see above), and was commissioned in 1972.

References 

 

United Kingdom
 
Energy in the United Kingdom
Electric power infrastructure in the United Kingdom
Electric power transmission in the United Kingdom